Phil Morrison is an American film director best known for the Academy Award-nominated feature film, Junebug (2005), which was also his debut.

In 2006, Morrison directed the "Get a Mac" advertising campaign for Apple Inc. In 2011, he directed an episode of Enlightened.

His second film, in 2013, was All Is Bright.

In 2019, it was announced that Morrison was to direct Satan Is Real, a biopic about the Louvin Brothers, starring Ethan Hawke and Alessandro Nivola.

References

External links

Apple Inc. advertising
Living people
Year of birth missing (living people)
Advertising directors